The 2009 Pilot Pen Tennis was a tennis tournament played on outdoor hard courts. It was the 41st edition of the Pilot Pen Tennis, and was part of the ATP World Tour 250 Series of the 2009 ATP World Tour, and of the Premier Series of the 2009 WTA Tour. It took place at the Cullman-Heyman Tennis Center in New Haven, Connecticut, United States, from August 21 through August 29, 2009. It was the last event on the 2009 US Open Series before the 2009 US Open.

ATP entrants

Seeds

 1 Seeds are based on the rankings of August 17, 2009

Other entrants
The following players received wildcards into the singles main draw

  Marcos Baghdatis
  Taylor Dent
  Rajeev Ram
  Fernando Verdasco

The following players received entry from the qualifying draw:
  Pablo Cuevas
  Frederico Gil
  Nicolás Lapentti
  Frederik Nielsen

The following player received the lucky loser spot:
  Olivier Rochus

WTA entrants

Seeds

 1 Seeds are based on the rankings of August 17, 2009
 Dominika Cibulková was forced withdrew due to right rib injury, so Samantha Stosur became the no. 9 seed.

Other entrants
The following players received wildcards into the singles main draw
  Svetlana Kuznetsova
  Nadia Petrova
  Meghann Shaughnessy

The following players received entry from the qualifying draw:
  Ioana Raluca Olaru
  Magdaléna Rybáriková
  Roberta Vinci
  Yanina Wickmayer

The following players received the lucky loser spots:
  Edina Gallovits
  Varvara Lepchenko

Finals

Men's singles

 Fernando Verdasco defeated  Sam Querrey, 6–4, 7–6(8–6)
It was Verdasco's first title of the year and third of his career.

Women's singles

 Caroline Wozniacki defeated  Elena Vesnina, 6–2, 6–4
It was Wozniacki's third title of the year, and the sixth of her career. It was her second win at the event, also winning in 2008.

Men's doubles

 Julian Knowle /  Jürgen Melzer defeated  Bruno Soares /  Kevin Ullyett, 6–4, 7–6(7–3)

Women's doubles

 Nuria Llagostera Vives /  María José Martínez Sánchez defeated  Iveta Benešová /  Lucie Hradecká, 6–2, 7–5.

External links
Official website

 
Pilot Pen Tennis
Pilot Pen Tennis
Pilot Pen Tennis
Pilot Pen Tennis
Pilot Pen Tennis
Pilot Pen Tennis